Crossover is Hitomi Shimatani's first special concept album, featuring "crossover versions" of popular tracks from her 4th album 追憶+Love Letter, as well as new songs.

Track listing
"早春" (Soushun)
"Perseus: ペルセウス" crossover version
"I Will"
"Garnet Moon" crossover version
"恋の雫" (Koi no Shizuku)
"Z!Z!Z!: Zip!Zap!Zipangu!" crossover version
"シャンティ" crossover version (Shanty)
"秘密" (Himitsu)
"愛歌" (Aika) 
"追憶＋Love Letter" crossover version (Tsuioku)

Hitomi Shimatani albums
2005 albums